The Rural Municipality of Woodworth is a former rural municipality (RM) in the Canadian province of Manitoba. It was originally incorporated as a rural municipality on December 22, 1883. It ceased on January 1, 2015 as a result of its provincially mandated amalgamation with the RM of Wallace and the Village of Elkhorn to form the Rural Municipality of Wallace – Woodworth.

The Sioux Valley Dakota Nation Indian reserve is located by its southeast corner of the former RM.

Communities 
 Harding
 Kenton
 Lenore

References 

 Manitoba Historical Society - Rural Municipality of Woodworth
 Map of Woodworth R.M. at Statcan
 Dorthy Vipond, Proudly we speak: a history of the Rural Municipality of Woodworth, Woodworth Centennial Committee, 1967,

External links 
 Official website

Woodworth
Populated places disestablished in 2015
2015 disestablishments in Manitoba